The 2022–23 Odisha Women's League is the 10th edition of the Odisha Women's League, the top Odia professional football league, since its establishment in 2011. Odisha Police are the defending champions. The league is organised by the Football Association of Odisha (FAO), the official football governing body of Odisha, in association with the Department of Sports and Youth Services (DSYS) of the Government of Odisha.

On 26 November 2022, the jersey launch ceremony of the six participating teams for the 2022–23 season was held in the presence of Minister of Sports for Government of Odisha, Tusharkanti Behera, and the Secretary of the Football Association of Odisha (FAO), Asirbad Behera, at the Kalinga Stadium. Football Association of Odisha (FAO) treasurer Bhakta Ballav Das, vice-president Dilip Kumar Sahoo, and joint-secretaries Avijit Paul and Sangeeta Sharma, and Department of Sports and Youth Services Officer-on-Special-Duty (OSD), Shuvendu Panda, were also present on the occasion alongside captains, coaches, and managers of all participating teams.

Teams

Personnel

Squads

Standings

Statistics

Scoring

References

Sports competitions in Odisha
1
2022–23 domestic women's association football leagues